The 1924 Missouri lieutenant gubernatorial election was held on November 4, 1924. Republican nominee Philip Allen Bennett defeated Democratic nominee Carter M. Buford with 51.46% of the vote.

Primary elections
Primary elections were held on August 5, 1924.

Democratic primary

Candidates
Carter M. Buford, former State Senator
Robert Lee Hains
Everard G. Hancock
Sam J. Coy

Results

Republican primary

Candidates
Philip Allen Bennett, former State Senator
Leslie J. Lyons

Results

General election

Candidates
Major party candidates
Philip Allen Bennett, Republican
Carter M. Buford, Democratic

Other candidates
William Ungerer, Socialist Labor

Results

References

1924
Gubernatorial
Missouri